The Minister of State Security (formerly the Minister of Intelligence Services) was a Minister of the South African government, who oversaw South Africa's civilian intelligence agencies and national security matters. In 2021 the ministry was abolished and the function of the minister was taken over by the Presidency.

Formation
In 1994, the intelligence service affairs were subordinated to the Minister of Justice. In 1995, Joe Nhlanhla became Deputy Minister of Justice with responsibility for intelligence affairs.

When Jacob Zuma was elected president in 2009 he renamed the post to Minister of State Security, but kept Siyabonga Cwele in the job. After the ANC election win in May 2014, Jacob Zuma announced the new Minister of State Security as David Mahlobo.

Agencies
The following Agencies and their entities fell under the oversight of the Minister of State Security:

State Security Agency
 National Intelligence Agency - now known as the Domestic branch
 South African Secret Service - now known as the Foreign branch
 National Communications Centre
 COMSEC (Electronic Communications Security (Pty) Ltd)
 South African National Academy of Intelligence

National Intelligence Co-Ordinating Committee

List of Past Ministers

Minister of Intelligence Services, 1999-2009

Minister of State Security, 2009-2021

References

External links
 Ministry of Intelligence Services
 Business Technology News and Information Site

South African intelligence agencies
South Africa
State Security